Calling the Ghosts: A Story about Rape, War and Women is a 1997 documentary film that details the experience of Nusreta Sivac and Jadranka Cigelj at the Bosnian Serb-run Omarska camp in Bosnia and Herzegovina during the Bosnian War. The film's premiere was sponsored by Amnesty International, the Coalition for International Justice, the Center for Human Rights and Humanitarian law, and the Bosnian branch of Women for Women International.

See also
 Rape in the Bosnian War

Notes

References

External links
 
 

1997 films
1997 documentary films
American documentary films
Documentary films about the Bosnian War
Serbo-Croatian-language films
News & Documentary Emmy Award winners
Documentary films about violence against women
1990s English-language films
1990s American films
Women in Bosnia and Herzegovina